Sorin Aristotel Avram (29 March 1943 – 29 September 2015) was a Romanian football player and coach.

He started his career in 1956, by joining the youth team of Letea Bacău. From there he moved to Dinamo Bacău in 1959 and then to Viitorul Bucharest in 1962.

Viitorul Bucharest was a project of the Romanian Football Federation in which they gather the best young players and formed a team which played in the Romanian top division, Divizia A.

From Viitorul, Avram joined Steaua București in 1963. Six years later he joined FC Farul Constanţa and then moved back to FCM Bacău in 1970, ended his career in 1973 at only 30.

He played a total of 226 games in Divizia A, scoring 38 goals. He was Romanian football champion with Steaua București in 1968 and won the Romanian Cup, again with Steaua București, in 1966 and 1967. He also won 12 caps for Romania, scoring one goal. He played for Romania at the 1964 Summer Olympics.

As a coach, he was head-coach of FCM Bacău for nine games during the 1991–92 season.

Honours
Steaua București
Romanian League: 1967–68
Romanian Cup: 1965–66, 1966–67, 1968–69

Notes

References

External links
 
 
 

1943 births
Association football forwards
2015 deaths
Romania international footballers
Olympic footballers of Romania
Footballers at the 1964 Summer Olympics
Romanian footballers
FC Steaua București players
FCV Farul Constanța players
FCM Bacău players
Romanian football managers
FCM Bacău managers
Liga I players
Liga II players
Sportspeople from Bacău